VRAC may refer to:

 Valladolid RAC, Spanish rugby union club
 Virtual Reality Applications Center, research center within the Engineering Teaching and Research Complex (ETRC) at Iowa State University
 Volume-regulated anion channel, which is crucial to the regulation of cell size